Sergio Luis Alberto Henríquez Díaz (born 25 March 1955) is a Chilean politician who served as minister of State under Eduardo Frei Ruíz-Tagle's government (1994–2000).

He was part of the board of Ripley S.A., Chilean retail company. Similarly, he is president of Casa de Moneda.

References

External links
 Profile at Annales de la República

1955 births
Living people
Chilean people
University of Chile alumni